George Albinson  (14 February 1897 – April 1975) was an English footballer. His regular position was at wing half. He was born in Prestwich, Lancashire. He played for Manchester United and Manchester City.

External links
MUFCInfo.com profile

1897 births
1975 deaths
English footballers
Manchester United F.C. players
Manchester City F.C. players
Crewe Alexandra F.C. players
English Football League players
Association football wing halves